Thomas Scully may refer to:

Sportspeople
 Tom Scully (cyclist) (born 1990), track cyclist from New Zealand
 Tom Scully (football manager) (1930–2020), Irish manager of Offaly
 Tom Scully (born 1991), Australian rules footballer
 Tom Scully (English footballer) (born 1999), English footballer

Others
 Thomas A. Scully (born 1957), American healthcare administrator
 Thomas J. Scully (1864–1921), American politician
 Tom Scully (Neighbours), a fictional character in Neighbours